Moosomin 112G is an Indian reserve of the Moosomin First Nation in Saskatchewan. It is 32 kilometres west of Spiritwood.

References

Indian reserves in Saskatchewan